"Amarte a Ti" is a song written by Walter Arenzon and co-written and produced by Daniel Freiberg and performed by Mexican singer-songwriter Cristian Castro from his fourth studio El Deseo de Oír Tu Voz (1996). It was released as the second single from the album. It became his third number-one song on the Billboard Hot Latin Tracks chart and his sixth number-one on the Latin Pop Airplay chart. It was recognized as on the best-performing songs of the year at the 1997 BMI Awards. The song was later covered by Dominican Republic merengue band Sin Fronteras on their album Abriendo Caminos (1996) and recorded a music video for it.

Charts

Weekly charts

Year-end charts

See also
Billboard Top Latin Songs Year-End Chart
List of number-one Billboard Hot Latin Tracks of 1996
List of Billboard Latin Pop Airplay number ones of 1996

References

1996 singles
1996 songs
Cristian Castro songs
Spanish-language songs
Fonovisa Records singles
1990s ballads
Latin ballads
Pop ballads